Kalyanpur (also Kalyanapur) is a small village which is situated in Delang block of Puri district, Odisha, India. The total number of inhabitants of this village is around 3,000. It is situated around 42 kilometers away from Puri District and 65 kilometers away from capital of Odisha, Bhubaneswar.

There are five schools, one post office, one medical, and one junior college.

References

Sources
Census of India, 1981: District census handbook. A, Village & town directory; B, Primary census abstract. Controller of Publications, India

External links
 Schools.org.in Kalyanpur HS

Villages in Puri district